Morsott District is a district of Tébessa Province, Algeria.

Districts of Tébessa Province